Windsor Historic District is a national historic district located at Windsor, Bertie County, North Carolina. It encompasses 78 contributing buildings, 1 contributing site, 7 contributing structures, and 1 contributing object in the town of Windsor.  It includes residential, commercial, and institutional buildings that primarily date after the turn of the 20th century. Notable buildings include the Bertie County Courthouse and Confederate Monument, Masonic Lodge (1848, 1917), Spruill Building, J. B. Gillam House, St. Thomas Episcopal Church, and Cashie Baptist Church (1910).

It was added to the National Register of Historic Places in 1982.

References

Historic districts on the National Register of Historic Places in North Carolina
Buildings and structures in Bertie County, North Carolina
National Register of Historic Places in Bertie County, North Carolina